The Barakat Foundation  is a charitable trust in Iran (a Bonyad) focused on economic development projects in rural areas. It has also stakes in Iran’s pharmaceutical industry. It's affiliated to the Execution of Imam Khomeini's Order which is controlled by Seyyed Ali Khamenei.

In 2013, one of its senior officials stated that during the last five years, the foundation had invested more than $1.6 billion in development projects, as well as building 200 schools, 400 homes and health clinics; and “nearly 100 percent of the income of Setad and the Tadbir Group is placed at the disposal” of the foundation; however, these claims are impossible to verify because its accounts are not publicly available.

History
The Barakat Foundation was established on 11 December 2007, two months after Mohammad Mokhber was elected as the leader of Setad, in order to perform activities in fields of entrepreneurship and the social and economic development in the deprived areas. The foundation was formerly managed by  Aref Norouzi. The current manager is Amir Hosein Madani.
  
Following the statement by Khamenei, the current Supreme Leader of Iran, i.e. “solve the problems of 1,000 villages. It would be good to develop 1,000 places or to build 1,000 schools. Prepare this organisation for this task”, Barakat was created as the affiliated department to Setad. The organization aimed to carry out construction projects in underdeveloped regions of the country as a “Leader’s gift to people living in these regions”, according to the IRNA.

Activity
Barakat Foundation aims to provide sustainable employment and facilitate process in villages.
As the head of the foundation's board of directors mentioned, Barakat Foundation is going to  provided 10,000 jobs in rural and deprived regions of Iran till March 2019.
In Sistan and Baluchestan Province, Barakat Foundation is going to establish two factories for packaging and processing dates to support farmers.
During five years Barakat has been supported several economic development projects, such as building schools, roads, housing units and mosques, as well as providing water and electricity.

Construction of schools 
According to the report of the International Quran News Agency, the Barkat Foundation has built 2,000 schools in cooperation with the Execution of Imam Khomeini's Order, and the 2,000th school was opened in March 2023. Among its other activities is the operation of 500 water supply projects to 500 deprived villages in the country. Likewise, According to the CEO of this foundation: "Building schools with Iranian Islamic identity is on the agenda of Barkat Foundation."

Health services 
The Foundation has prepared health services for deprived populations and has supported over 60,000 cancer patients by building equipped cancer clinic type 3. The Foundation has carried out 482 economic and entrepreneurship projects for 198,000 people who need a job in 31 provinces of the country. Six pharmaceutical companies affiliated to setad, under the administration of the Barakat Foundation is spending their income in for charitable movement.

Telehealth 
The Barakat Foundation and Execution of Imam Khomeini's Order (in cooperation with the Ministry of Health) have pursued/implemented the issue of Telehealth. According to the minister of Health, Saeed Namaki: "... This great scientific work helps us in order to utilize a tool called "telemedicine" in these (far) areas of the country. This new approach (telemedicine) allows us to increase productivity in Islamic Republic of Iran's specialized manpower and have health justice in the farthest areas of Iran. He also added, "it began in the farthest and most deprived parts of the country."

Services in Arba'een pilgrims 
Among the activities of this foundation is related to its participation in infrastructure development and providing services to Arba'een pilgrims at the borders.

Projects 
According to the CEO of Barkat Foundation: 57,000 construction projects have been initiated in Barkat Foundation and nearly 52,000 of them have come to fruition.

COVID-19 Vaccine 

COVIran Barekat, the first COVID-19 vaccine produced by Iranian researchers has been produced by Shifa-Pharmed Company (a subsidiary of Barakat Pharmaceutical Group). The human-injection of the first phase of clinical studies of the Iranian corona vaccine on December 29, 2020; The first phase of human testing of the vaccine began with the injection for 56 volunteers. The second group of the volunteers was also injected with the vaccine. According to the head of the vaccine production team at the Setad, the results show that this vaccine also neutralizes the British mutated COVID-19 virus. The vaccine has passed the phase(s) 2 and 3 of clinical studies; and currently it has reached its final phase. The production line of 25 million doses per month of the vaccine was discharged on 26 April 2021.

With the signing of a memorandum (of understanding) of cooperation between the Barakat Foundation and the Deputy Minister of "Cultural Heritage, Handicrafts and Tourism", the process of creating 3,000 jobs began with the support of 1,000 handicraft production projects with priority given to the victims of COVID-19. According to the Deputy Coordinator of the Execution of Imam Khomeini's Order: On 27 July 2021, about 5 million doses of Iran Barakat vaccine have been produced in Shafa-farmad factory so far.

According to IRNA, quoting the spokesman of the National Corona Headquarters and the Deputy Minister of "Ministry of Health and Medical Education": "Barakat Iranian vaccine is (also) produced exclusively for Omicron."

Ehsan-Barakat Charity foundation

Ehsan-Barakat Charity foundation associated to Execution of Imam Khomeini's Order and Barekat Foundation was founded in order to request of current Supreme Leader of Iran, Ali Khamenei to provide more quickly help for individual cases (needy people). As Mokhber, the chief of Execution of Imam Khomeini's Order nominated, the activities which be performed by the Charity relies on people’s help.

According to Mohammad Vudud Madani, the manager of Ehsan-Barakat in May 2018,  3 trailer equipped with medical equipment and 2 service trailers, as well as 10 tents with a capacity of 140 hospital beds, were prepared and sent for deprived areas. The Charity organized that 8000 needy people who live in deprived areas including  Helmand region, Hamoun and Nimroz in Sistan and Baluchestan province, cities from South Khorasan Province  and Ahmadfedaleh Rural District, travel to Karbala in Arba'een as the special campaign called "the Visa of Paradise".

Barakat Tel
The Barakat Tel Company is one of the companies affiliated with the Execution of Imam Khomeini's Order, funded by Barakat Foundation as a designer and executor of the Electronic Health Program to develop services at the deprived areas of the country in the field of public health. The company provides 18 types of electronic services during the Electronic Health Program.

Barkat Pharmaceutical Group

The Barkat Pharmaceutical Group is a subsidiary of the Setad, which was established in 2010 under the name of "New Technologies of Tedbir Pharmaceutical Technologies".

The company provides services through cooperation with Knowledge enterprises and the world's medical scientists.

Barkat Ventures 
Barkat Ventures is the part of  Setad for New Technologies and the Development of Knowledge Economy. Its duties are introduced based on Iranian-Islamic pattern in establishing and expanding the ecosystem and infrastructure for the development of knowledge and activities of Knowledge enterprise.

See also

 Execution of Imam Khomeini's Order
 Bonyad
 Economy of Iran
 Barkat Ventures
 15 Khordad Foundation

References

Charities based in Iran
Front organizations
Foundations based in Iran
Execution of Imam Khomeini's Order
Manufacturing companies of Iran